Do Phool (Two Flowers) is a 1958 Indian Hindi-language family drama film directed by A. R. Kardar. Adapted from the 1881 children's novel Heidi by Johanna Spyri,  it has Baby Naaz in the role of Poornima (Heidi). The film was produced by Akhtar Sultana Kadar, with dialogues written by Krishan Chander. The music director was Vasant Desai, and the lyrics were written by Hasrat Jaipuri. The film starred Romi, Baby Naaz, Vijaya Choudhary, Bipin Gupta, Ulhas, David, Agha, and Jeevan.

The film involved a young orphan girl, Poornima, living with her grandfather in the hills. She's put to work by her Aunt as a companion to a rich disabled girl, Rupa, in the city. The film then focuses on the bonding between the two girls and Rupa's eventual rehabilitation.

Plot
Poornima (Naaz), a young orphan girl stays with her Aunt Shankri in a village called Neecha Nagar, at the foothills of Pawan Ghat. Her grandfather, Chacha Sagar (Bipin Gupta), whom she rarely meets, lives a lonely existence atop the hill in a cottage. Shankri is a greedy conniving woman, and instead of having to take care of Poonima, she leaves her with her grandfather. Here Poornima meets a young goatherd, Jaggu (Romi), who brings his goats for grazing every day and returns to his blind mother (Pratima Devi) in Neecha Nagar at sunset. Jaggu and Poornima become friends and develop a close bond. Shankri enters Poornima's life again, as she intends to put her in service so she can earn money. In spite of her grandfather objecting, Shankri puts Poornima to work in Seth Girja Shankar's (Ulhas) house in the city.

Poornima becomes a friend and companion to the Seth's eleven-year-old daughter, Rupa (Vijaya Choudhary). Rupa is wheel-chair bound following a bout of typhoid which left her extremely weak. Soon Rupa and Purnima become friends, which is frowned upon by Rupa's strict governess. Purnima enjoys her life with Rupa learning to read and write, but continues to pine for the free air of the mountains and the greenery. A Doctor is called, who advises the Seth to let Poornima return to Pawan Ghat. Jaggu is ecstatic that Poornima has returned and they wander around the hills again. However, his happiness is short-lived as Rupa, who had been missing Poornima, makes her father send her to Pawan Ghat. Rupa soon starts to feel healthy with the fresh mountain air, wholesome meals, and goat's milk provided to her. One day, Jaggu, in a frenzy of jealousy due to Poornima's close friendship with Rupa, pushes Rupa's wheelchair down the hill. Rupa realises she does not need her wheelchair as she is able to move around freely.

Cast
 Baby Naaz as Poornima
 Master Romi as Jaggu
 Vijaya Choudhury as Rupa
 Bipin Gupta as Poornima's grandfather, Sagar Chacha
 Ulhas as Rupa’s father, Seth Girja Shankar
 Jeevan as Masterji
 Pratima Devi as Jaggu's mother
 Mumtaz Begum as Rupa's Aunt
 S. N. Banerji 
 Rajan Haksar as the doctor
 Nasreen
 Amir Bano

Crew
 Director: A. R. Kardar
 Producer: Mrs. Akhtar sultana 
 Editing: Shri Anekar
 Cinematography: Dwarka Divecha
 Music: Vasant Desai
 Lyrics: Hasrat Jaipuri
 Choreographer: Prem Dhawan
 Sound Recordist: Yeshwant Mitkar
 Art Direction: G.V. Divkar

Soundtrack
Asha Bhosle sang the popular number "Aayi Pari Rangbhari, Kisne Pukara" in Raga Kalavati. Music was composed by Vasant Desai with lyrics by Hasrat Jaipuri. The playback singers were Asha Bhosle, Lata Mangeshkar and Aarti Mukherjee.

Song list

References

External links
 
 Do Phool Songs by Vasant Desai at Sounds of Sonawade

1958 films
1950s Hindi-language films
Films based on Swiss novels
Heidi films
Films directed by A. R. Kardar
Films scored by Vasant Desai